Six ships of the Royal Navy have borne the name HMS Tribune, after the Tribunes, elected magistrates of the Roman Republic and Empire:

  was a 36-gun fifth rate, previously in French service.  She was captured in 1796 by HMS Unicorn, and was wrecked in 1797.
  was a 36-gun fifth rate launched in 1803. She was rebuilt as a 24-gun sixth rate in 1832 and was wrecked in 1839.
  was a wood screw frigate launched in 1853 and sold in August 1866 to Marshall of Plymouth for breaking up.
  was an  launched in 1891 and sold in 1911.
  was an  launched in 1918 and sold in 1931.
  was a T-class submarine launched in 1938 and broken up in 1947.

Royal Navy ship names